Jañuma Pirwa (Aymara jañu mosquito, uma water, pirwa, piwra granary, Hispanicized spelling Jañuma Pirhua) is a  mountain in the Andes of Peru. It is located in the Arequipa Region, Caylloma Province, Tisco District. It lies southwest of Chuqi Pirwa and southeast of Pirwa.

The Pirwamayu (Quechua for "granary river") originates north of the mountain. It flows to the south as a right affluent of the Qullqa River.

References

Mountains of Peru
Mountains of Arequipa Region